Gymkhana Ground is a cricket ground in the Secunderabad, Telangana. No major stadiums are located in Secunderabad apart from Gymkhana Ground and is the most important ground in the city.

History 

The ground was established in 1928 when Hyderabad Cricket Club and Raja Dhanrajgir's XI played on the ground in Behram-ud-Dowlah Tournament. In 1931, the ground hosted its first first-class match between Hyderabad and Maharaj Kumar of Vizianagram's XI. In 1997, the ground hosted a Women's World Cup match between England Women's and Denmark Women's played against each other.

See also 
 1997 Women's Cricket World Cup

References

External links 
 Cricketarchive
 Cricinfo
 Wikimapia
 Hero Honda Women's World Cup from CricInfo

Football venues in Telangana
Sports venues in Telangana
Sports venues in Secunderabad
Cricket grounds in Telangana
Cricket in Hyderabad, India
Multi-purpose stadiums in India
Sports venues completed in 1928
1928 establishments in India
20th-century architecture in India